Testimonial is an album by the American drummer Carl Allen, released in 1995. It combines the musical styles of jazz and gospel. Allen supported the album with a North American tour.

Production
Allen wrote the majority of the songs. "Come Sunday" is a cover of the Duke Ellington song. "Holy Land" was written by Cedar Walton. Cyrus Chestnut played the organ. Kevin Mahogany sang on "A City Called Heaven".

Critical reception

Westword called the album a mostly successful attempt "to infuse creative jazz with a heavy dose of spirituality." The Calgary Herald determined that, "as a drummer, [Allen] has little more to offer than brawn and metronomic timing." The Ottawa Citizen noted that "trumpeter Nicholas Payton has begun making his name with fiery, flawless playing."

The Washington Post wrote that "Tuesday Night Prayer Meeting" "boasts an infectious melody and has Allen sounding like a whole church full of hand-clapping worshipers." The Globe and Mail stated that Allen "explores the hidden and not-so-hidden connections between gospel music and hard bop." The New York Times deemed Testimonial "a religious concept album" on which "everyone is reluctant to relinquish his be-bop cool."

AllMusic wrote that there's "nothing in particular wrong with the music, which is heartily played and deeply felt ... except for the fact that it's covering ground that's been pretty much trampled into dust."

Track listing

References

1995 albums
Atlantic Records albums